The Ceylon Chamber of Commerce is the oldest and one of leading business chambers in Sri Lanka. It is a confederation of trade associations, regional- and sectoral chambers of commerce and industry, business councils and employer organisations in the country.

History
The Ceylon Chamber of Commerce was established on March 25, 1839,  when Sri Lanka was known as Ceylon under British rule.

Rt. Hon. J A Stewart Mackenzie, then Governor of Ceylon, was instrumental to found the Ceylon Chamber of Commerce as he was keenly interested in promoting agriculture and trade in Ceylon.

A meeting was held on February 20, 1839 by a considerable number of the mercantile community favourable to the establishment of a Chamber of Commerce in the island of Ceylon. It was unanimously resolved as a preliminary measure that five of the gentlemen present should be requested to form a Committee for framing an estimate and drawing up certain rules and regulations, which when submitted and approved might form the ground work of the institution.

The General Meeting of thirteen representatives of the mercantile community was held on March 25, 1839 at the Corner House of Prince Street. With the adoption of the rules and regulations of the Ceylon Chamber of Commerce, the first Chamber was established in Sri Lanka.

Subsequently, in 1895 the Chamber was incorporated by the then Legislative Council under the Ceylon Chamber of Commerce Ordinance No. 10 of 1895. In 1954 Terrence de Soysa was appointed as the first Sri Lankan Chairman.

See also

 International Chamber of Commerce

References

External links
 Website of The Ceylon Chamber of Commerce
 The Ceylon Chamber appoints Mrs. Dhara Wijayatilake as its CEO

Chambers of commerce
Organizations established in 1839
Economy of Sri Lanka
Trade associations based in Sri Lanka